Wang Ning is the name of:

 Wang Ning (general) (born 1955), commander of the People's Armed Police
 Wang Ning (politician, born 1959), deputy governor of Sichuan                                                        
 Wang Ning (politician, born 1960), deputy mayor of Beijing
 Wang Ning (politician, born 1961), Communist party secretary of Yunnan
 Wang Ning (politician, born 1966), former politician, Party Secretary of Liulin County
 Wang Ning (male announcer) (born 1964), former CCTV News reporter
 Wang Ning (female announcer) (born 1980), CCTV-13 MC
 Wang Ning (volleyball) (born 1994), Chinese volleyball player